Sarita may refer to:

People 
 Sarita Choudhury (born 1966), British-Indian actress
 Sarita Khajuria (1974–2003), British-Indian actress
 Sarita Joshi (born 1941), Indian television actress
 Sarita Pérez de Tagle (born 1986), Filipina actress
 Sarita Schoenebeck, American computer scientist
 Laishram Sarita Devi (born 1982), Indian boxer
 Sarita, ring name of professional wrestler Sarah Stock (born 1979)

Other uses 
 796 Sarita, a minor planet
 Sarita (magazine), a Hindi magazine published by Delhi Press Group
 Sarita (play), a 1984 play by Maria Irene Fornes
 Sarita, Texas, United States
 Sarita Lake, Vancouver Island, British Columbia, Canada
 USS Sarita (AKA-39), an Artemis-class attack cargo ship
 a doll in the Manhattan Toy Groovy Girls doll line
 a character in the video game The Walking Dead: Season Two

See also
Sarah (disambiguation)
Sarai (disambiguation) / or Serai / Saraj
Saraya (disambiguation)
Saray (disambiguation)
Sabina (disambiguation)
Sabrina (disambiguation)
Sariya (disambiguation)
Seraiah, a Hebrew name
Seraya (disambiguation)

Indian feminine given names
Hindu given names